Giancarlo Amadeo (1 February 1934 – 22 June 2021) was an Italian professional football player and coach.

Career
Amadeo played as a full back for Pro Patria (making 256 appearances), Legnano and Vigevano, before working as a coach.

References

1934 births
2021 deaths
Italian footballers
Aurora Pro Patria 1919 players
A.C. Legnano players
Vigevano Calcio players
Serie A players
Serie B players
Association football fullbacks
Italian football managers
Association football coaches
People from Busto Arsizio
Sportspeople from the Province of Varese
Footballers from Lombardy